The Count's Men (also released as Swing Lightly) is an album by alumni of the Count Basie Orchestra led by jazz trumpeter Joe Newman and recorded in 1955 for the mail order Jazztone label.

Reception

Allmusic awarded the album 3 stars.

Track listing
 "The Sidewalks of New York" (James W. Blake, Charles B. Lawlor) - 5:40
 "Careless Love" (W. C. Handy) - 8:41
 "Jumpin' at the Woodside" (Count Basie) - 7:16
 "Casey Jones" (Eddie Newton, T. Lawrence Seibert) - 4:52
 "The Midgets"  (Joe Newman) - 3:30
 "Alone In The Night" (Judy Spencer) - 5:00
 "A. M. Romp" (Ernie Wilkins, Joe Newman) - 10:06
 "Annie Laurie" (Traditional - 6:58
 "Frankie and Johnnie" (Traditional) - 7:12 Bonus track on CD reissue

Personnel 
Joe Newman- trumpet
Benny Powell - trombone
Frank Wess - flute, tenor saxophone
Frank Foster - tenor saxophone
Sir Charles Thompson - piano
Eddie Jones - bass
Shadow Wilson - drums
Ernie Wilkins - arranger

References 

1955 albums
Joe Newman (trumpeter) albums